Henry Milner may refer to:

 Henry Ernest Milner (1845–1906), English civil engineer and landscape architect
 Henry M. Milner, 19th-century British playwright and author